During the 2006–07 season AFC Ajax participated in the Eredivisie, the KNVB Cup, UEFA Champions League and the UEFA Cup. The first training took place on Saturday, 8 July 2006. The traditional AFC Ajax Open Day was on Wednesday, 8 August 2006, followed by a testimonial match for the retired former Ajax striker Dennis Bergkamp.

Pre-season
The first training for the 2006–07 season was held on July 8, 2006. In preparation for the new season Ajax organized a training camp in De Lutte, Netherlands at the De Thij Sportpark. During the pre-season, the squad from manager Henk ten Cate played friendly matches against JOS Watergraafsmeer, ABS, SV de Lutte, HHC Hardenberg, VV Bennekom, SV Spakenburg and FC Emmen before traveling to Germany to play against Borussia Dortmund. They then returned to Amsterdam to play Internazionale and Manchester United in the annual Amsterdam Tournament.

Player statistics 
Appearances for competitive matches only

|-
|colspan="14"|Players sold or loaned out after the start of the season:

|}
As of 14 November 2011

Team statistics

2006–07 Eredivisie standings

Points by match day

Total points by match day

Standing by match day

Goals by match day

Statistics for the 2006–07 season
This is an overview of all the statistics for played matches in the 2006–07 season.

2006–07 team records

Top scorers

Placements

 Wesley Sneijder is voted Player of the year by the supporters of AFC Ajax.
 Ryan Babel is voted Talent of the year by the supporters of AFC Ajax.

Results
All times are in CEST

Johan Cruijff Schaal

Eredivisie

Play-offs

Round 1

Round 2

KNVB Cup

UEFA Champions League

Play-Off round

UEFA Cup

First round

Group stage

Final phase

Round of 32

Amsterdam Tournament 

Final standings of the LG Amsterdam Tournament 2006

Friendlies

Transfers for 2006–07

Summer transfer window 
For a list of all Dutch football transfers in the summer window (1 July 2006 to 1 September 2006) please see List of Dutch football transfers summer 2006.

Arrivals 
 The following players moved to AFC Ajax.

Departures 
 The following players moved from AFC Ajax.

Winter transfer window 
For a list of all Dutch football transfers in the winter window (1 January 2007 to 1 February 2007) please see List of Dutch football transfers winter 2006–07.

Arrivals 
 The following players moved to AFC Ajax.

Departures 
 The following players moved from AFC Ajax.

External links 
Ajax Amsterdam Official Website in Nederlandse
UEFA Website

Ajax
AFC Ajax seasons